DI.KEAS. Neas Ionias (full name Dikefalos Asteras Neas Ionias) was a Greek club based in Nea Ionia, Athens. It was founded in 2004 and it plays in A1 Ethniki handball (first-tier). The recent years, the club was named IEK Xini Dikeas after its sponsor, IEK Xini Schools. The club’s colours are red and black and the arena of the club is Neas Ionias Indoor Hall, near Pefkakia train station. The club won the championship of the 2016–17 season. This was the last season of the club because subsequently it was replaced by Olympiacos Piraeus, since it was bought by it.

History
DIKEAS was founded in 2004. In 2013 the club finished in the first place of Beta Ethniki championship (third-tier) and promoted to A2 Ethniki. The next season, Dikeas finished again in first place and promoted to A1 Ethniki. Its first season in A1 Ethniki it finished in 6th place. In season 2016–17 DICEAS won the Greek championship for first time at its history. Subsequently the club merged with Olympiacos and was replaced by it in the handball championship.

Recent seasons

Honours
Greek Men's Handball Championship
Winner (1): 2017

European record

References

External links
Official page

Greek handball clubs
Sports clubs in Athens